The FIS Alpine World Ski Championships 1989 were held February 2–12 in the United States at Vail, Colorado. Outside of the Winter Olympics of 1960 and 1980, the alpine world championships returned to the U.S. for the first time since 1950, which were also in Colorado at Aspen. Vail's first championship served to re-introduce Colorado to a European audience, with coverage of the events broadcast during prime time due to the difference in time zones. The championship was marked by the death of the President of the Spanish Olympic Committee Alfonso, Duke of Anjou and Cádiz, who was beheaded by a cable which he collided with as it was being raised to support a finish line banner.

Vail and Beaver Creek later hosted the World Championships a decade later, in 1999, and again in 2015.

Men's competitions

Downhill
Monday, February 6

Super-G
Wednesday, February 8

Giant Slalom
Thursday, February 9

Slalom
Sunday, February 12

Combination
Monday, January 30, and Friday, February 3

Women's competitions

Downhill
Sunday, February 5

Super-G
Wednesday, February 8

Giant Slalom
Saturday, February 11

Slalom
Tuesday, February 7

Combination
Sunday, January 29, and Thursday, February 2

Medals table
References

External links
FIS-ski.com – results – 1989 World Championships – Vail, Colorado, USA
FIS-ski.com – results – World Championships
Ski-db.com - 1989 Vail - Alpine World Ski Championships

FIS Alpine World Ski Championships
1989
A
Sports competitions in Colorado
1989 in American sports
Alpine skiing competitions in the United States
FIS Alpine
February 1989 sports events in the United States
Skiing in Colorado